Jeremy Francis "Jez" Williams (born 18 February 1970) is the guitarist/songwriter of Doves. He was born in Manchester, England, and is the twin brother of bandmate Andy and the son of noted modernist architect Desmond Williams. Before their incarnation as Doves, the three members were a dance-club music trio called Sub Sub.

His earlier bands include Metro Trinity, whose first EP called "Die Young" was released in 1987 on Cafetieria Records, based in Hulme, Manchester. Members also included Tim Whiteley, Colin Rocks, Pete Zichovitch and Jonny Male, who later became the main songwriter/guitarist in the band Republica. Williams played guitar on Republica's debut album Republica.

While Doves were on a hiatus between 2010 and 2020, Jez and Andy Williams formed a side project called Black Rivers, releasing a self-titled album in February 2015.

As well as playing guitar, Jez sings backing vocals and also takes lead vocals on some songs; the B-side "Your Shadow Lay Across My Life", "Words" from The Last Broadcast, "The Storm" from Some Cities, "Jetstream" and "Compulsion" from Kingdom of Rust and "Mother Silverlake" from The Universal Want''.

References

1970 births
Living people
English rock guitarists
English songwriters
English male singers
English rock singers
Doves (band) members
Musicians from Manchester
English male guitarists
21st-century English singers
21st-century British guitarists
21st-century British male singers
British male songwriters